Patricia "Little Pattie" Thelma Thompson (née Amphlett) OAM (born 17 March 1949) is an Australian singer who started her career as a teenager in the early 1960s, recording surf pop, with her backing group The Statesmen, she subsequently went onto to record adult contemporary music. 

Billed as Little Pattie, she released her debut single in November 1963, "He's My Blonde Headed, Stompie Wompie, Real Gone Surfer Boy" which peaked at No. 19 on the national Kent Music Report and entered No. 2 in Sydney.

She appeared regularly on television variety programs, including Bandstand, and toured as a support act for Col Joye and the Joy Boys. Little Pattie was entertaining troops during the Vietnam War in Nui Dat, Vietnam, as an Australia Forces Sweetheart (in the vein of Lorrae Desmond, Dinah Lee and others), when the nearby Battle of Long Tan began on 18 August 1966. 

In 1994 she received the Vietnam Logistic and Support Medal "in recognition of her services in support of the Australian Armed Forces in operations in Vietnam."

Beginnings

Patricia Thelma Amphlett was born in March 1949 in Paddington, New South Wales, and has an older brother, Joe. She is the cousin of the late Chrissy Amphlett, frontwoman of Australian band Divinyls. She was educated at King Street Primary School and Sydney Girls High School. She was nicknamed "Little Pattie" at school as she had two taller friends also named Patricia. 

At eight years old, she commenced piano lessons with Gwen Parsons, and then singing lessons when 11 years old. Parsons also taught Noeleen Batley, a popular singer called "Australia's Little Miss Sweetheart". Both persuaded her to audition for the Nine Network TV teen variety show Saturday Date, where she was a hit. She first appeared on TV, singing on the Opportunity Knocks series, when she was 13. While a third-year high school student, at the age of 14, she performed weekly at the Bronte Surf Club as lead singer of the Statesmen with Nev Jade, Peter Maxworthy, Duncan McGuire (on bass guitar), Mark Rigby and Peter Walker. Singer-songwriter Jay Justin  was impressed with her vocals and recommended her for a recording contract with EMI.

Teenage singing star

Little Pattie's debut single was the double A-sided "He's My Blonde Headed, Stompie Wompie, Real Gone Surfer Boy" / "Stompin' at Maroubra", both co-written by Jay Justin and record producer Joe Halford, which used the surf music style and a dance style craze that was known as 'The Stomp'. It was released by EMI on HMV in November 1963 when she was aged 14, and reached No. 2 on the Sydney music charts (#1 was the Beatles' "I Want to Hold Your Hand"), No. 6 in Brisbane, and peaked at No. 19 on the national Kent Music Report. Little Pattie left school in early 1964, and released her debut album, The Many Moods of Little Pattie on EMI / HMV. She had further hits on the Sydney charts with "We're Gonna Have a Party Tonight" (#18 in March), "Pushin' a Good Thing Too Far" (#28 in March 1965) and "Dance Puppet Dance" (#9 in October). 

Her popularity saw her voted as Australian Female Singer of the Year in 1965. She appeared frequently on television variety programs, including Bandstand, Saturday Date, An Evening With and Sing, Sing, Sing. 

Little Pattie regularly toured supporting Col Joye & the Joy Boys, with Judy Stone, Cathy Wayne and international star Sandie Shaw. The Joy Boys included Joye's brothers Kevin Jacobsen on piano and Keith Jacobsen on bass guitar.

Along with Col Joye & the Joy Boys she performed three concerts each day in Nui Dat. Although organisers had promised her safety, she was evacuated from the area before the completion of her scheduled performances.

In the days after the battle, Joye and Little Pattie visited injured soldiers in hospital to comfort and sing to them. In 1994 she received the Vietnam Logistic and Support Medal in recognition of her services in support of the Australian Armed Forces in operations in Vietnam. From 1966, Little Pattie was performing solo in cabarets and clubs, she continued releasing singles and albums with EMI until 1970, and then signed with Joye's ATA recording label and management group. She subsequently appeared on several TV shows in America, including The Ed Sullivan Show.

Later career

As Little Pattie entered her twenties, she continued her career moving into adult contemporary music. During the 1972 Australian Federal election campaign she sang with other entertainers including Joye and Judy Stone in the Australian Labor Party's "It's Time" TV commercial, which featured future Prime Minister, Gough Whitlam. Styled as Pattie Amphlett from 1972, she released singles and albums on ATA / Festival Records and by 1977 had moved into country music. In 1973, she married Keith Jacobsen (Joy Boys' bass guitarist, ATA record producer and manager) and continued to perform on television and in clubs. Amphlett parted from Keith in 1984 and married Lawrie Thompson (a drummer) in 1986. 

Her repertoire included swing tunes from Gershwin, Rodgers and Hart, and Cole Porter. In 1990, she toured China as vocalist for veteran jazz musician Graeme Bell and his Allstars. As Patricia Thompson, she became an active unionist in the entertainment industry, and a vocal teacher, later coaching Nikki Webster before her performance at the 2000 Summer Olympics in Sydney. She has taught at a number of Sydney high schools: Burwood Girls High School, St. Joseph's College, Hunters Hill, Mercy College, Chatswood and Saint Ignatius' College, Riverview.

In 2001 EMI re-released a compilation album, 20 Stompy Wompy Hits, which featured her early songs. The ABC-TV series Long Way to the Top was broadcast in August 2001. Little Pattie featured on Episode 1, "Bed of a Thousand Struggles 1956–1964", where she discussed her early surf music and 'The Stomp' dance craze. The TV series inspired the Long Way to the Top national concert tour during August–September 2002, which featured a host of the best Australian acts of the 1950s, 1960s and 1970s including Little Pattie and Col Joye and the Joy Boys. In 2004, General Peter Cosgrove invited her to be patron of FACE (Forces Advisory Council on Entertainment) and she was invited to go to Iraq to perform for Christmas 2005 and New Year 2006. She performed at the "Salute to Vietnam Veterans" held at the Australian War Memorial in Canberra on 19 August 2006.

In addition to her music career, Little Pattie was a member of the Council for the Australian War Memorial from 1995 until 1998, and received an Order of Australia Medal in 2003 for her services (as national President) to the Media, Entertainment and Arts Alliance and (as vice-president) to Actors' Equity. She has been on the Federal Executive of the Australian Council of Trade Unions (ACTU). In 2000 The Sydney Morning Herald included her on a list of the 'century's most loved faces', and she was included in a 1998 issue of Australian stamps featuring pop and rock acts.

On 27 August 2009, Little Pattie was inducted into the Australian Recording Industry Association (ARIA) Hall of Fame alongside Kev Carmody, The Dingoes, Mental As Anything and John Paul Young. She was inducted by her cousin, Christina Amphlett of Divinyls, with former Australian Idol star, Lisa Mitchell performing "He's My Blonde-Headed, Stompie Wompie, Real Gone Surfer Boy".

She is currently a singing teacher at various high schools in Sydney, including St Joseph's College and Burwood Girls High School.

Personal life
In 1973, Little Pattie married Joy Boys' bass guitarist and ATA record producer and manager Keith Jacobsen, brother of Colin (Col Joye) and Kevin Jacobsen. Keith and Little Pattie parted in 1984 and she subsequently married Lawrie Thompson in 1986.

National honours 
Little Pattie received a Medal of the Order of Australia on 9 June 2003 for her services to the Media, Entertainment and Arts Alliance (as National President) and to Actors Equity (as vice-president). On 27 August 2009, Little Pattie was inducted into the Australian Recording Industry Association (ARIA) Hall of Fame alongside Kev Carmody, The Dingoes, Mental As Anything and John Paul Young.

Discography
Releases by Little Pattie unless otherwise indicated:

Albums

Extended plays

Singles

Charity singles

FILM
 Natural Causes (1985)
 Breaking Loose: Summer City II (1988)
 The Sharp End (1992) (Film documentary)

TELEVISION
 Opportunity Knocks (1963)
 Sing, Sing, Sing (1963-1965)
 Ampol Stamp Quiz (1964)
 Teen Scene (1964)
 Saturday Date (1965)
 Bandstand (1965-1968)
 The Go!! Show (1966-1967)
 An Evening With (1966)
 The 10th Annual TV Week Logie Awards (1968) (TV special)
 Sounds Like Us (1970)
 The Ed Sullivan Show (1970) (US)
 25 Years Of Channel Nine (1971) (TV special) (archival clips)
 Carry On Spike In Australia (1972) (TV special)
 The Bert Newton Show (1973)
 Matt Flinders And Friends (1973)
 The Graham Kennedy Show (1973;1975)
 The Ernie Sigley Show (1974-1975)
 The Norman Gunston Show (1975)
 Countdown (1976;1977;1981)
 Bandstand '76 (1976)
 The Celebrity Game (1977)
 This Is Your Life? Johnny O'Keefe (1977) 
 The 1978 Australian Song Festival (1978) (TV special)
 Festival Of Carols (1978) (TV special)
 This Fabulous Century (1979)
 Young Talent Time (1979) (Herself)
 Countdown (1981)
 Australian Music Stars Of The 60s (1982) (TV special) (archival clips)
 The Daryl Somers Show (1982)
 Countdown Music & Video Awards 1983 (1984) (ABC TV special)
 Television: The First 30 Years (1986) (TV special)
 Have A Go (1987)
 The N.S.W. Royal Bicentennial Concert (1988) (TV special)
 Good Morning Australia (1988)
 The Bert Newton Show (1988;1989)
 35 Years Of Australian Television (1991) (TV special) (archival clips)
 Good Morning Australia (1994-2003)
 Fifty Fantastic Years (1995) (TV special)
 Our Century (1996)
 When Rock Was Young: The 60s (1998) (TV special)
 Barry Humphries' Flashbacks (1999) (archival clips)
 Laws (1999) 
 This Fabulous Century: The Heroes (1999) (TV special)
 Long Way To The Top (2001)
 Long Way To The Top: Live In Concert (2002) (ABC TV special)
 Love Is In The Air (2003)
 Billy Thorpe Memorial Service (2007) (TV special)
 ABC News (2007)
 Talking Heads (2007)
 Bert's Family Fued (2007)
 Today (2008,2012)
 Mornings With Kerri-Anne (2008)
 Aria Hall Of Fame 2009 (2009) (TV special)
 Spicks & Specks (2010)
 Anzac Day March (2011- )
 The Morning Show (2012)
 Today Extra (2012)
 Sunrise (2012)
 ABC News Breakfast (2012)
 Long Way To The Top 10th Anniversary Special (2012) (TV special)
 The Time Of My Life (2013)
 News Breakfast (2016;2021)
 Australian Story (2016)
 Men Of Wood And Foam (2017) (Foxtel TV Special)
 News Breakfast (2020)
 Nine Late News (2021)
 Australian Women In Music Awards (2022) (ABC2 TV special)

Notes

A."He's My Blonde-Headed, Stompie Wompie, Real Gone Surfer Boy" / "Stompin' at Marourbra" was originally released as a double A-sided single by Little Pattie & the Statesmen in November 1963. Both tracks appeared on the EP, He's My Blonde Headed Real Gone Stompie Wompie Surfer Boy in December and subsequently appeared on the album, The Many Moods of Little Pattie in 1964.

Awards and nominations

ARIA Music Awards
The ARIA Music Awards is an annual awards ceremony that recognises excellence, innovation, and achievement across all genres of Australian music. They commenced in 1987. Little Pattie was inducted into the Hall of Fame in 2009.

|-
| ARIA Music Awards of 2009
| herself
| ARIA Hall of Fame
|

Australian Women in Music Awards
The Australian Women in Music Awards is an annual event that celebrates outstanding women in the Australian Music Industry who have made significant and lasting contributions in their chosen field. They commenced in 2018.

|-
| 2018
| Patricia Amphlett
| Lifetime Achievement Awards
|

Go-Set Pop Poll
The Go-Set Pop Poll was coordinated by teen-oriented pop music newspaper, Go-Set and was established in February 1966 and conducted an annual poll during 1966 to 1972 of its readers to determine the most popular personalities.

|-
| 1966
| herself
| Female Vocal
| 4th
|-
| 1967
| herself
| Female Vocal
| 5th
|-
| 1968
| herself
| Female Vocal
| 4th
|-

Mo Awards
The Australian Entertainment Mo Awards (commonly known informally as the Mo Awards), were annual Australian entertainment industry awards. They recognise achievements in live entertainment in Australia from 1975 to 2016. Little Pattie won one award in that time.
 (wins only)
|-
| 2009
| Little Pattie
| John Campbell Fellowship Award 
| 
|-

Honours and awards
 Vietnam Logistic and Support Medal

 Medal of the Order of Australia (OAM)

References

General

External links
Little Pattie, ATA Allstar Artist profile
Brief biography, Long Way to the Top, ABC
Reach For The Stars Performing Arts Website
Australian War Memorial archive: copyright photographs of Pattie preparing for, and performing in, Vietnam (August 1966):    
 Other copyright photos: PopArchives, Operation Catalyst, Iraq, December 2005

1949 births
ARIA Award winners
ARIA Hall of Fame inductees
Living people
Logie Award winners
Recipients of the Medal of the Order of Australia
Singers from Sydney
Surf musicians
Australian women pop singers
People educated at Sydney Girls High School